Bridgeport is an unincorporated community in the town of Bridgeport, Crawford County, Wisconsin, United States.

Notes

Unincorporated communities in Crawford County, Wisconsin
Unincorporated communities in Wisconsin